Martina Englhardt-Kopf (born 8 June 1981) is a German teacher and politician of the Christian Social Union (CSU) who has been serving as a member of the Bundestag since 2021.

Early ife and career
Englhardt-Kopf was born in 1981 in the West German town of Schwandorf.

Political career
Since the 2021 elections, Englhardt-Kopf has been a member of the Bundestag, representing the Schwandorf district. In parliament, she has since been serving on the Committee on Transport and the Committee on Petitions. In addition to her committee assignments, she is part of the German Parliamentary Friendship Group for Relations with Slovakia, the Czech Republic and Hungary.

Other activities
 Federal Network Agency for Electricity, Gas, Telecommunications, Posts and Railway (BNetzA), Member of the Rail Infrastructure Advisory Council (since 2022)

References 

Living people
1981 births
Members of the Bundestag 2021–2025
21st-century German politicians
21st-century German women politicians
Female members of the Bundestag
People from Schwandorf (district)